Nic Waal, born Caroline Schweigaard Nicolaysen in Kristiania, Norway (1 January 1905 – 28 May 1960) was a Norwegian psychiatrist, noted for her work among children and adolescents in Norway where she is known as "the mother of Norwegian pediatric and adolescent psychiatry." She was also active in the Norwegian resistance during World War II, and was named as one of the  Righteous among the Nations by Yad Vashem.

Biography

Caroline Schweigaard Nicolaysen (known in her childhood as Bitteba) was the youngest of four children born to Vilhelm Bernhoft Nicolaysen, an Army officer, and Anna Horn. She grew up in the section of Oslo known as Homansbyen, apparently an active and curious child, but also unusually sensitive. According to her son Helge Waal, she was prone to psychosomatic illnesses as a young child; and indeed she completed her first year of gymnasium at home, due to illness. She attended the Oslo Cathedral School starting in the fall of 1921, where her schoolmates included Trygve Bull, Karl Evang, and Trygve Braatøy.

She attended the University of Oslo, became politically active as a radical socialist, and finished her medical studies in 1930. She was associated with the Mot Dag movement and worked as an editor in the periodical Æsculap. The political convictions she developed as a student set the foundation for a lifelong engagement in social causes, especially related to the needs of children, adolescents, and women.

Plagued with her own emotional problems all her life, she first underwent psychoanalysis with Harald Schjelderup in Norway while she was a student. In 1927 she married the writer Sigurd Hoel. She continued her psychoanalysis in Berlin as a student under Salomea Kempner, and in 1933 and 1934 she was accepted in the German and Danish-Norwegian Psychoanalytic associations, respectively. In 1936, Sigurd Hoel and she divorced, and in 1937 she married Wessel Waal and took the last name Waal for good.

While in Berlin, Waal became associated with Wilhelm Reich and accompanied him when he fled Nazi persecution by moving to Norway. She continued her training first under another refugee from the Nazi regime, the Austrian Otto Fenichel, and then with Reich until 1939, when she opened her own psychoanalytic practice and joined the staff at Gaustad psychiatric hospital, where she remained on staff until 1947.

During the German occupation of Norway from 1940 to 1945, Waal became active in the underground resistance to the occupation. Among other activities, she was central in assuring the escape of Jewish children from Oslo, thereby saving them from deportation and certain death. For this effort, she was named among the Norwegian Righteous among the Nations. She was also active in the Norwegian clandestine intelligence service, XU.
In the spring of 1945, she was briefly arrested and escaped to Sweden.

Waal resumed her professional activities immediately after the war. She remained on the staff at Gaustad and also at Ullevål hospital, but also worked in Denmark, United States, Switzerland, and France, with Serge Lebovici. She was remembered by Cyrille Koupernik as "that Norwegian madwoman". In 1951, she was board certified as a psychiatrist, and in 1953, as one of the first in Norway, within paediatric and adolescent psychiatry.

Soon after her application to be the chief of staff at the newly formed Institute for Paediatric and Adolescent Psychiatry at Rikshospitalet was turned down (supposedly because her physical presentation was messy) in 1951, she started her own institute, named Nic Waals Institutt; first in her basement in the suburb Husebygrenda and eventually to the "blue house" in Munkedamsveien near Skillebekk.

Waal remained professionally active as the director of her institute until her death in 1960, also finding time to help juvenile offenders. She had two children with Wessel Waal, the psychiatrist Helge Waal (who also became her biographer) and the child psychologist Berit Waal Skaslien. She divorced Waal and married Alex Helju in 1951, who died in a boating accident in 1954.

Professional contributions and legacy

In spite of her personal problems, Nic Waal maintained an active and passionate professional life, integrating advocacy on public health issues, a strong interest in teaching, and clinical discipline into a broad range of issues in her field. She made lasting contributions within the areas of:

 The practice of psychoanalysis and psychotherapy, usually within the context of Wilhelm Reich's framework but independently of his views. She did pioneering research and clinical work within the field of somatic psychiatric diagnostic techniques.
 Paediatric and adolescent psychiatry as a distinct field in Norwegian mental health
 Human sexuality, particularly among children and adolescents.
 Education - her institute provided educational programs for six distinct professions, including non-medical professionals such as psychologist, social workers, and clinical educators

When interviewed by the Norwegian radio shortly before her death, she said:

 

The Nic Waal Institute, though renamed for some time, now continues as a leading regional teaching and clinical institution in Oslo under the auspices of Lovisenberg Diakonale Sykhus.

Literature

 - a book on the medium of film and its effect on children.
 - a book on parenting infants.
 - "Personality diagnosis with the purpose of structural descriptions - a publication of her institute.
 - an outline of Waal's somatic diagnostic methodology.
 - published posthumously, but translated to several languages, on the role of parenting and sexual neuroses.
  - selected writings by Nic Waal.
 - biography authored by her son, Helge Waal.
 - biographical essays of Henrik Ibsen, Knut Hamsun, Sigurd Hoel, Agnar Mykle, and others
 - anniversary publication for her institute.

See also
 Ola Raknes

External links
 Nic Waal – her activity to save Jews' lives during the Holocaust, at Yad Vashem website

References

1905 births
1960 deaths
Norwegian medical researchers
Norwegian resistance members
Female resistance members of World War II
Norwegian psychiatrists
Norwegian women psychiatrists
Norwegian Righteous Among the Nations
XU
Mot Dag
Norwegian women in World War II
University of Oslo alumni
People educated at Oslo Cathedral School
Norwegian psychology writers
Norwegian women non-fiction writers